This article presents a list of the historical events and publications of Australian literature during 1891.

Books 
 Jennings Carmichael – Hospital Children: sketches of life and character in the Children's Hospital, Melbourne
 Charles Haddon Chambers – Thumb-Nail Sketches of Australian Life
 Fergus Hume – Whom God Hath Joined: A Question of Marriage
 Hume Nisbet
 The Black Drop
 The Savage Queen: A Romance of the Natives of Van Dieman's Land

Short stories 
 Mary Gaunt – "The Yanyilla Steeplechase"
 Louisa Lawson – "A Bush Experience"
 A. B. Paterson
 "The Cast-Iron Canvasser"
 "His Masterpiece"
 Campbell Praed – "The Bunyip"
 Price Warung
 "John Price's Bar of Steel"
 "The Liberation of the First Three"

Poetry 

 Barcroft Boake
 "The Digger's Song"
 "On the Range"
 "Where the Dead Men Lie"
 Victor J. Daley – "Lachesis" 
 George Essex Evans
 "An Australian Symphony"
 The Repentance of Magdalene Despar and Other Poems
 Henry Lawson
 "Freedom on the Wallaby"
 "My Literary Friend"
 "The Shame of Going Back"
 Louisa Lawson – "A Dream"
 Harriet Anne Patchett Martin – Coo-ee : Tales of Australian Life by Australian Ladies (edited)
 J. B. O'Hara – Songs of the South
 A. B. Paterson
 "An Evening in Dandaloo"
 "The Flying Gang: A Railroad Song"
 "In the Droving Days"
 "A Mountain Station"
 "The Open Steeplechase"
 Alice Werner – "Bannerman of Dandenong: An Australian Ballad"

Births 

A list, ordered by date of birth (and, if the date is either unspecified or repeated, ordered alphabetically by surname) of births in 1891 of Australian literary figures, authors of written works or literature-related individuals follows, including year of death.

 9 April – Lesbia Harford, poet (died 1927)

Deaths 

A list, ordered by date of death (and, if the date is either unspecified or repeated, ordered alphabetically by surname) of deaths in 1891 of Australian literary figures, authors of written works or literature-related individuals follows, including year of birth.

See also 
 1891 in poetry
 List of years in literature
 List of years in Australian literature
 1891 in literature
 1890 in Australian literature
 1891 in Australia
 1892 in Australian literature

References

Literature
Australian literature by year
19th-century Australian literature
1891 in literature